"Nobody" is a song by British singer-songwriter Shara Nelson, released in May 1994 as the fifth single from her first solo album, What Silence Knows (1993), through Cooltempo Records.

Critical reception
Pan-European magazine Music & Media wrote, "The singles taken from What Silence Knows are innumerable. But still with this neo soul track one doesn't have the idea of listening to a leftover, proving the depth of the album." Jonathan Bernstein from Spin felt a "forbidding tone is established" on the song, as the opening track of the album.

Track listings
 UK CD single
 "Nobody" (Perfecto Scratch edit) – 4:47
 "Nobody" (The Kenny Dope mix) – 4:31
 "Nobody" (Delta House of Funk mix) – 7:31
 "Nobody" (Perfecto 12-inch) – 6:15
 "Nobody" (album mix) – 4:22

 European CD single
 "Nobody" (Perfecto Scratch edit) – 4:47
 "Nobody" (Perfecto 12-inch) – 6:15
 "Nobody" (The Kenny Dope mix) – 4:31
 "Nobody" (Delta House of Funk mix) – 7:31

Charts

References

External links
 

1993 songs
1994 singles
Cooltempo Records singles
Shara Nelson songs
Songs written by Shara Nelson